Penhow is a small village and community (parish) just inside the eastern edge of the boundary of the city of Newport, South Wales, within the historic county of Monmouthshire. The name Penhow is believed to be derived from the Welsh word Pen meaning head or top and How derived from the Old Norse word Haugr meaning hill or mound. The community includes the estate of Parc Seymour.

History and architecture

Roman remains
Fragments of Roman building material have been found in the area. These include evidence of a Roman building at Llanvaches, an artefact at Penhow, and a Roman Road at Parc Seymour.

Penhow Castle

Penhow is best known for Penhow Castle, which has claims to be the oldest inhabited castle in Wales. It was built by Sir Roger de St Maur, one of the Norman knights who served the Norman Lord of Striguil at Chepstow Castle.  He built a tower house, and documentary evidence shows that he was at Penhow by 1129. It is the first known British home of the St Maur alias Seymour family which rose to national prominence in the 16th century in the person of Queen Jane Seymour, the third wife of King Henry VIII, represented today by the Duke of Somerset. Later the Seymour family, which moved to Hatch Beauchamp in Somerset and Wulfhall in Wiltshire, sold Penhow Castle to the Lewis family of St. Pierre, who converted the castle to a modern residence in 1674. Thomas Lewis' son Thomas was High Sheriff of the county, and married the daughter of Sir Richard Levett, Lord Mayor of London. The Lewis family retained ownership of Penhow Castle for several centuries.

The castle, which has a reputation for being haunted, was open to the public between 1978 and 2002.

Church of St. John the Baptist
The parish church of St. John the Baptist is next to the castle.  It has 13th-century origins and was the subject of restoration work in the 19th century.

Village Shop 
Following the closure of the privately run shop in 2008, the Penhow Community banded together to finance & re-generate the village shop. Community volunteers re-decorated, re-stocked and re-opened the shop in November 2008. Since re-opening the shop has been managed and operated by the community and, where possible, stock has been sourced locally. Since opening, the team has had to learn how to be retailers and how to manage stock levels, but all the hard work has paid off and the shop continues to serve the local community.

Rock and Fountain 
The Rock and Fountain Inn is a 17th-century coaching inn on the edge of the village.  The historic inn and its five-acre site underwent a £1m renovation and redevelopment during 2010.  The inn reopened as a steak and seafood restaurant in November 2010. It was later transformed into an Italian restaurant and closed a few years later. The Rock & Fountain opened again in June 2014 serving 2 courses for £10.

In February 2018, the Indian restaurant (located behind the Rock & Fountain) closed and in April, the building was transformed into a Churrascaria.

Penhow History Society
In 2016 a Penhow History Society was set up to examine Penhow's varied history. It was formed to research local history projects around the village and aims to promote a wider interest in its history through the publication of articles and organising public talks.

Temperature record
Penhow also holds the current high record July temperature for Wales of 34.2 °C (93.5 °F), set on 18 July 2006.

Government 
Penhow has a community council comprising eight members.

The area is part of the Bishton and Langstone ward for elections to Newport City Council.

Notes

References

External links
Geograph photos of Penhow area
Castle Wales website on Penhow castle
Penhow Community Council website
 Penhow History Group

Communities in Newport, Wales
Villages in Newport, Wales